Brandon Stanton (born March 1, 1984) is an American author, photographer, and blogger. He is the author of Humans of New York, a photoblog and book. He was named to Time magazine's "30 Under 30 People Changing The World" list.

Since 2010, Stanton has taken hundreds of portraits of people living and working primarily in New York City, accompanied by bits of conversations about their lives. He has also traveled outside of the United States, capturing people and their lives in more than 20 countries, including Iran, Iraq, Uganda, Democratic Republic of the Congo, Ukraine, Vietnam, and Mexico.

Life and work
Stanton grew up in Marietta, Georgia, a suburb of Atlanta, where he completed his schooling at The Walker School in 2002. He majored in history at the University of Georgia. In 2010, he bought a camera while working as a bond trader in Chicago, and started taking photographs in downtown Chicago on the weekends. When he lost his job a short time later, he decided to pursue photography full-time. Moving to New York City, he set out to photograph 10,000 New Yorkers and plot their portraits on a map of the city, surviving on unemployment checks to "almost pay rent" and borrowing money from friends and family. Eventually, he moved his photographs to the Humans of New York Facebook page, which he started in November 2010. After posting a photo of a woman including a quote from her, he soon began adding captions and quotes to his photographs, which eventually evolved into full interviews.

His Humans of New York book was published in October 2013. It received positive reviews and sold 30,000 copies as preorders. The book reached the number 1 position on The New York Times Non-Fiction Best Sellers of 2013 for the week beginning November 3, 2013. The book remained on the list for 26 weeks, again reaching the number one position on December 21, 2014.

In December 2013, Stanton was named one of Time magazine's "30 Under 30 People Changing The World." In August 2014, he traveled to the Middle East to photograph people as part of a 50-day trip through 10 countries in the region under the auspices of the United Nations. In July 2015, he traveled to Pakistan and again to Iran to do the same. At the conclusion of his trip to Pakistan, Stanton crowdfunded $2.3 million to help end bonded labor in Pakistan.

In January 2015, Stanton was invited to the Oval Office to interview President Barack Obama. The trip concluded a two-week crowdfunding campaign on Humans of New York in which $1.4 million was raised.

In March 2016, Stanton opposed Donald Trump's presidential campaign, criticizing Trump on social media for hateful speech, such as delayed disavowing "white supremacy" and defending those who commit violence at his rallies. A day after his Facebook post, it had over 1.6 million likes and was shared nearly 1 million times.

Stanton has posted stories and photos from the Pediatrics Department of Memorial Sloan Kettering Cancer Center in New York City. As he did for his other projects, Stanton created a fundraising campaign, and raised over $3.8 million for pediatric cancer research.

Publications

Tanqueray. With Stephanie Johnson. New York: St. Martin's Press. 2022. ISBN 9781250278272

Awards
2013: People's Voice award, Best Use of Photography category, 2013 Webby Award for Humans of New York.
2013: Time magazine placed him in its list of "30 Under 30 World Changers".
2014: James Joyce Award from the Literary and Historical Society (L&H) of University College Dublin (UCD).

References

External links

 
 Brandon Stanton: The Good Story TEDx

1984 births
Living people
American bloggers
American portrait photographers
Articles containing video clips
Patreon creators
People from Chicago
People from Marietta, Georgia
University of Georgia alumni